Charterhouse, also known as Charterhouse-on-Mendip, is a hamlet in the Mendip Hills Area of Outstanding Natural Beauty (AONB) in the English county of Somerset. The area between Charterhouse and Cheddar Gorge including Velvet Bottom and Ubley Warren is covered by the Cheddar Complex Site of Special Scientific Interest.

Name 
The name is believed to come from the Carthusian order of Chartreuse in France, which was established in Witham (near Frome) in 1181 and formed a cell at Charterhouse in 1283 with a grant to mine lead ore.

History 

There is evidence, in the form of burials in local caves, of human occupation since the late Neolithic/Early Bronze Age.

The lead and silver mines at Charterhouse, were first operated on a large scale by the Romans, from at least AD 49. At first the lead/silver industries were tightly controlled by the Roman military, but within a short time the extraction of these metals was contracted out to civilian companies, probably because the silver content of the local ore was not particularly high. There was also some kind of 'fortlet' here in the 1st century, and an amphitheatre. The Roman landscape has been designated as a Scheduled Ancient Monument.

The parish was part of the Winterstoke Hundred.

After the Dissolution of the Monasteries, it was granted to Robert May who constructed a substantial house here and one of his descendants John May became High Sheriff of Somerset in 1602.

There is further evidence of mine workings in the medieval and Victorian periods, some of which survives within the Blackmoor Nature Reserve owned by Somerset County Council. There is also evidence of a rectangular medieval enclosure.

Caves 
There are several caves in the limestone around the village including Manor Farm Swallet and Upper Flood Swallet.

Church 

The Church of St Hugh was built in 1908 by W.D. Caroe, on the initiative of the Rev. Menzies Lambrick, from the former welfare hall for the lead miners. It is a Grade II* listed building. A cross in the churchyard and the churchyard wall are also listed buildings.

The roof-truss, screen, rood, and altar are all made of carved whitened oak.

References

External links 

Aerial photograph of Roman fort
Charterhouse Centre
 Map of Charterhouse circa 1900

Villages in Mendip District
Mendip Hills
Scheduled monuments in Mendip District